The Cabinet of Jan Svankmajer is a 1984 British surreal short stop-motion film by the Quay Brothers, an homage to the influential short film maker Jan Švankmajer.

Summary
It is structured as a series of little lessons on perception  at Prague in a form of a puppet simulacrum of Svankmajer, whose head is an opened book, to a doll whose head the masters empties of dross and refills with a similar open book.

Availability
Available as part of the Phantom Museums DVD collection of Quay Brothers shorts.

References

External links
  
The Cabinet of Jan Svankmajer on YouTube
  Excerpt on Vimeo

Films directed by the Brothers Quay
1984 films
1980s animated short films
Stop-motion animated short films
1984 animated films
Jan Švankmajer
Films set in Prague
British animated short films
1980s British films